Zhou Wenjing, was a Chinese imperial painter during the Ming Dynasty. His birth and death dates are unknown, but he was active until some time after 1463.

Zhou, pseudonym Sanshan, was a native of Hexian (now Putian) in Fujian province. He was skillful at landscape painting and followed in the style of Xia Gui. He enjoyed the patronage of the elderly Xie Huan.

References

Ming dynasty landscape painters
Painters from Fujian
People from Putian
Year of birth unknown
Year of death unknown